Polistichus is a genus of beetles in the family Carabidae, containing the following species:

 Polistichus connexus (Geoffroy, 1785)
 Polistichus fasciolatus (P. Rossi, 1790)
 Polistichus inornatus Gestro, 1881

References

Dryptinae